Anagaloidea is an extinct order of placental mammals that first appeared during the Paleocene epoch.

Taxonomy
According to the traditional (morphological) view, Anagaloidea is part of the superorder Anagalida, along with the elephant shrews, rodents and lagomorphs.

However, the Anagalida are considered to be polyphyletic. Genetic studies have shown that the elephant shrews are actually part of a different macro-group of mammals called the Afrotheria, while the position of several extinct families of Anagalida is uncertain. The Zalambdalestidae are almost certainly unrelated to any of these groups; they probably represent more basal Eutherians and might not even be true Eutherians at all.

The Anagalidae and the Pseudictopidae probably represent a genuine clade. This clade is known as the Anagaloidea, which seems to be related to the rodents and lagomorphs after all. Together they form the clade Glires, often grouped with the Euarchonta to form the superorder Euarchontoglires.

Classification
Superorder Anagalida *
Order Anagaloidea
Family Anagalidae
Genus Anagale
Family Pseudictopidae
Family Astigalidae?
Family Zalambdalestidae?
Genus Zalambdalestes

References

Glires
Cretaceous mammals
Mammal orders
Prehistoric animal orders